The 2017 Austrian Athletics Championships was the year's national championship in outdoor track and field for Austria. It was held on 8 and 9 July at the Linzer Stadion in Linz. It served as the selection meeting for Austria at the 2017 World Championships in Athletics.

Results

Men

Women

References 

 Österreichische Staatsmeisterschaften, Linz, 08.07.2017 - 09.07.2017 – Ergebnisse
 Österr. Staatsmeisterschaften (mit ÖM Langstaffeln U18) Linz 08.07.2017 - 09.07.2017 – Verfügbare Disziplinen 
 Vorschau Leichtathletik-Staatsmeisterschaften in Linz 
 Österreichische Staatsmeisterschaften in Linz 2017 - 1. Tag 
 Österreichische Staatsmeisterschaften in Linz 2017 - 2. Tag

External links 
 Official website of the Austrian Athletics Federation 

2017
Austrian Athletics Championships
Austrian Championships
Athletics Championships
Sports competitions in Linz